The 2008 United States Senate election in Idaho was held on November 4, 2008. The primary elections were held on May 27. Incumbent Republican U.S. Senator Larry Craig decided to retire instead of seeking a fourth term. Republican Jim Risch won the open seat.

Background 
Incumbent Larry Craig announced his intent to resign following an incident where he allegedly solicited another man for gay sex in a public restroom. Craig later decided not to resign; however, he announced that he would not seek re-election. The filing deadline for the election was March 21, 2008. A total of 13 candidates filed for the seat. Republican and Democratic candidates ran for their respective nominations in the May 27 primary.

Lieutenant Governor Jim Risch defeated a crowded field for the Republican nomination, while former Congressman Larry LaRocco won the Democratic nomination in similar fashion. Conservative independents Rex Rammell and Pro-Life (formerly Marvin Richardson) also qualified for the general election ballot. Former Caldwell city council member Kent Marmon secured the Libertarian nomination. In the general election, Risch defeated LaRocco and the other candidates to keep the seat in Republican hands.

Republican primary

Candidates 
 Jim Risch, Lieutenant Governor of Idaho
 Fred Adams
 Brian Hefner
 Bill Hunter
 Richard Phenneger, Businessman
 Hal James Styles
 Scott Syme, Iraq War veteran
 Neal Thompson

Results

Democratic primary

Candidates 
 Larry LaRocco, former U.S. Representative
 David J. Archuleta

Results

General election

Candidates 
 Larry LaRocco, former U.S. Congressman (Democratic)
 Kent A. Marmon, former member of the Caldwell City Council (Libertarian)
 Pro-life (Independent)
 Rex Rammell, veterinarian, elk rancher, and Republican candidate for State House in 2002 and 2004 (Independent)
 Jim Risch, Lieutenant Governor and former Governor (Republican)

Predictions

Polling

Results

See also 
 2008 United States Senate elections

References

External links 
 U.S. Congress candidates for Idaho at Project Vote Smart
 Robinson Research
 Idaho, U.S. Senate from CQ Politics
 Idaho U.S. Senate from OurCampaigns.com
 Idaho U.S. Senate race from 2008 Race Tracker
 Campaign contributions for Idaho congressional races from OpenSecrets
 Official campaign websites (Archived)
 Jim Risch, Republican nominee
 Larry LaRocco, Democratic nominee
 Kent Marmon, Libertarian nominee
 Rex Rammell, Independent candidate

2008
Idaho
United States Senate